Røkke is a Norwegian surname. Notable people with the surname include:

Kjell Inge Røkke (born 1958), Norwegian businessman
Mona Røkke (1940–2013), Norwegian politician
Nils Anders Røkke (born 1963), Norwegian scientist and businessman

Norwegian-language surnames